Hawksworth is a small, early twentieth-century council estate in the Kirkstall ward in Leeds, West Yorkshire, England.

It is situated on a hill between West Park and Horsforth and is circled by Butcher Hill, the A65 and Vesper Road. Hawksworth lies within the LS5 Kirkstall postcode area and is commonly known as The Hawk, The Hawky or The Hawky Estate.

Etymology
The name Hawksworth appears to have been given to the estate as recently as its foundation in the twentieth century, and is not covered by the relevant English Place Name Society surveys. The name also belongs to the ancient village of Hawksworth five miles away and may have been transferred to the Hawksworth estate from there.

The name Hawksworth Wood probably refers to the wood that stood to the west of Kirkstall Abbey. It provided shelter, fuel, pannage and building resources such as thatch for the abbey; timber was generally brought from elsewhere since Alexander, the founding abbot of Kirkstall who completed the initial building work, was concerned to preserve the woodland at Hawksworth.

History
After the First World War, councils were encouraged to build 'Homes fit for Heroes', and by 1930 7,000 new council houses had been built in Leeds, on estates which included the Hawksworth Wood.

The woodland around the Hawksworth estate lies within the framework of the Upper Aire Valley. Parts of these sites were formerly quarried or gleaned for millstone grit but have now reverted to woodland and scrub.

The woodlands are predominantly mixed broadleaves mainly containing oak and sycamore, with the understories consisting of rowan, hazel, holly and guelder rose. Small pockets of heather can also be found. These woodlands provide considerable colour and diversity to this suburban and formerly industrial area and are currently managed to ensure a continuity of multi-aged tree cover. Great Hawksworth has received active management in recent years through the removal of invasive tree species and the promotion of understorey and ground flora.

Another interesting fact concerning the area is that the 1933 Penny of George V, a classic rarity, had been placed under the foundation stone of St. Mary's Church in the area. Most accounts indicate that a mere seven pieces were struck for special presentation purposes, and only three currently reside in private collections. In 1933 there was no requirement for the Royal Mint to produce any pennies because there were already enough in circulation. Requests were, however, received for sets of coins dated 1933 to be placed under the foundation stones of buildings erected in that year, and the Mint obliged by striking a small number of coins. The result was to create a rarity that many people thought could turn up in their change.

Reports indicate that in 1970, during construction at Church of St. Cross, Middleton, one of these examples was stolen. In response, the Bishop of Ripon ordered that the St. Mary's Church 1933 Penny be unearthed and sold as a protective measure to prevent its theft.

Numerous public rights of way run through the woods which are accessible via Butcher Hill, Hawksworth Road, New Road Side, Abbey Road, Vesper Road, Cragside Walk and Cragside Close.

There is a metal hatch in Hawksworth Woods which is actually the entrance to an old explosives store from when the woods were once quarried for stone. It has been mistaken for a Second World War shelter.

Facilities
Hawksworth contains various different stores, including a Co-op, LloydsPharmacy and two small Premier stores. Other facilities include various independent takeaway stores, hairdressing salons and a taxi service.

A Post Office facility was situated on Broadway, however was eventually closed down due to lack of staff willing to operate the premises. An intregreted Premier store has since taken over responsibility of main Post Office functions. However, as of July 2021, the postbox outside the previous Broadway premises still remains in use.

Previously there was a pub on Vesper Road titled The Woodway, however this was closed in the 1990s.

Education

Primary Education 
Hawksworth Wood Primary School is the sole primary school on the estate. The school was split into two during the 1970s into Hawksworth Wood Primary and Vesper Gate Middle School. Vesper Gate Middle School has since been redeveloped into Hawksworth Wood Children's Centre. On opening, the children's centre included an adult education facility run by Leeds City College however this closed soon after.

Secondary Education 
Hawksworth does not contain any secondary education facilities itself. However, there are numerous secondary schools around the area where residents may attend, including Abbey Grange Church of England Academy, Lawnswood School and Horsforth School.

Culture 
An episode of TV series A Touch of Frost named "Held in Trust", released in 2003, had some scenes filmed at Hawksworth Primary School.

See also
Listed buildings in Leeds (Kirkstall Ward)

References

Places in Leeds
1933 in England